Manuel Cruz Sobreviñas (7 April 1924 – 18 July 2020) was a Filipino prelate of the Catholic Church.

Sobreviñas was born in Dinalupihan, Philippines and was ordained a priest on March 10, 1951. Sobreviñas was appointed auxiliary bishop of the Archdiocese of Manila on April 7, 1979, as well as titular bishop of Tulana, and was consecrated on May 25, 1979. On February 25, 1993 he was appointed bishop to the Diocese of Imus until retirement on October 22, 2001. He died on 18 July 2020 at Cardinal Santos Medical Center. At the time of his death, Sobreviñas was the oldest living Filipino bishop.

References

External links
Manila Archidocese  (Filipino)

1924 births
2020 deaths
People from San Juan, Metro Manila
20th-century Roman Catholic bishops in the Philippines
Participants in the Second Vatican Council
Roman Catholic bishops of Imus